Maria Geraldine Capeña Jamora Pacquiao (née Jamora; born January 12, 1979), more known as Jinkee Pacquiao is a Filipina socialite, media personality, occasional film producer and former politician who served as a vice governor of Sarangani, Mindanao, Philippines from 2013 to 2016. She is well known as the wife of professional Filipino boxer and Senator Manny Pacquiao. She also had a brief career in the film industry as a producer for her husband's documentaries and for several box-office titles.

Early life
Jinkee Jamora was born at St. Elizabeth Hospital in General Santos on January 12, 1979, into the conservative family of Nestor Jamora (born c. 1956, Kiamba, Sarangani) and Rosalina Capeña (born c. 1957, Silago, Southern Leyte). She was born along with her identical twin sister, Janet.

Political career
In 2013, Pacquiao decided to run for vice governor of Sarangani province in Mindanao,  after her husband was reluctant to choose between two friends who both wanted his support for the position. She was elected in the May 2013 election as the candidate of the United Nationalist Alliance.

After her first and only term, Jinkee decided to retire from politics to focus on their family and her businesses.

Personal life
She was working as a round girl when she met Manny Pacquiao, whom she married in 1999. They have five children.

In popular culture 
 Portrayed by Bea Alonzo in Pacquiao: The Movie (2006)

References 

1979 births
Filipino women in business
Living people
Notre Dame Educational Association alumni
People from General Santos
People from Sarangani
People's Champ Movement politicians
Filipino twins
United Nationalist Alliance politicians
Waray people
Jinkee
21st-century Filipino women politicians
21st-century Filipino politicians